Dr. Robert "Bob" Williams is a former American football player for the University of Notre Dame.

Williams won three championships with G.A.R. Memorial High School in Wilkes-Barre, Pennsylvania.  From his years playing for Terry Brennan at Notre Dame, Williams is best remembered for ending the record 47-game winning streak of the Oklahoma Sooners with a 7-0 victory on November 16, 1957.

Williams was drafted by the Chicago Bears in 1959 (coincidentally, he was the second Notre Dame QB with the name "Bob Williams" to be selected by the Bears during the same decade), but instead he chose to enroll at the University of Pittsburgh School of Medicine.  He was inducted into the Pennsylvania Sports Hall of Fame in 2002.  His son Brian Williams played center for the New York Giants from 1989 to 1999. His grandson, Maxx Williams, is currently a tight end for the Arizona Cardinals.

References
 
 Notre Dame NFL Draft History

Year of birth missing (living people)
Living people
Sportspeople from Wilkes-Barre, Pennsylvania
American football quarterbacks
Notre Dame Fighting Irish football players
University of Pittsburgh alumni
Players of American football from Pennsylvania